Inside Story was an Australian current affairs television program airing weekly on the Nine Network. The program is hosted by Leila McKinnon and commenced on 26 February 2014. It screens Wednesday evenings normally at 8.45pm (Series 1) and Thursdays at 8:40 (Series 2) and 7:30 (Series 3).

The series investigates major crimes and related stories in Australia and elsewhere with a view to unveiling previously unreported/under-reported stories. Reporters include Alicia Loxley, Tom Steinfort, Peter Stefanovic, Deborah Knight, Jayne Azzopardi and Brett McLeod

On 31 March 2014, the show was renewed for a second season.

In response to Gerard Baden-Clay being found guilty of murdering his wife Allison, a special edition of the program titled Inside Story: Baden-Clay aired live-to-air on 15 July 2014 hosted by Tracy Grimshaw and Karl Stefanovic.  In December 2015 the charge against  Baden-Clay was downgraded to manslaughter.

Episodes

Series 1 - True Crimes (2014)

Specials

Series 2 (2015)

Series 3 (2016)

+Melbourne, Adelaide & Perth

References

External links

Nine News
Australian television news shows
2014 Australian television series debuts
English-language television shows
Television shows set in Sydney